Dipodium gracile is an orchid species that is native to Sulawesi in Indonesia. The species was formally described in 1911 by German botanist Rudolf Schlechter.

References

External links

gracile
Orchids of Indonesia
Plants described in 1911